This is a list of records and statistics of the football men's tournament in the Pan American Games ever since the inaugural official edition in 1951.

Medal table 

 1975 Gold medal shared between Brazil and Mexico

Participating nations
Teams participate with their U-23 squads. In some cases such as in 1951 (for Venezuela and Costa Rica) some countries sent their full squad (including players over the age of 22).

Medals by confederation

Debut of national teams

Hosts

All-time table

Following is the overall table of Men's football in Pan American Games. Wins before 1995 counts 2 points, after 1995 counts 3 points.

Top scorers by tournament

Winning managers 

Following is the list with all winning manangers of Men's Pan American Games football tournament. Guillermo Stabile is the only one to have won the tournament more than once, in the first two editions. The German Lothar Osiander is the only foreign winner, with USA in 1991, and Luis Fernando Tena is the only one to manage to win both the Pan American Games and the Summer Olympics.

Teams records

 Most titles won 7,  (1951, 1955, 1959, 1971, 1995, 2003, 2019).
 Most finishes in the top three 12,  (1951, 1955, 1959, 1963, 1971, 1975, 1979, 1987, 1995, 2003, 2011, 2019).
 Most finishes in the top four 12,  (1951, 1955, 1959, 1963, 1971, 1975, 1979, 1987, 1995, 2003, 2011, 2019);  (1955, 1967, 1975, 1987, 1991, 1995, 1999, 2003, 2007, 2011, 2015, 2019).
 Most appearances 16,  (1955, 1959, 1967, 1971, 1975, 1983, 1987, 1991, 1995, 1999, 2003, 2007, 2011, 2015, 2019, 2023).
 Most consecutive medals 8,  (1991, 1995, 1999, 2003, 2007, 2011, 2015, 2019).
 Most consecutive golds 3,  (1951, 1955, 1959).
 Most consecutive silvers 2,  (1991, 1995).
 Most consecutive bronzes 2,  (1975, 1979),  (2007, 2011).
 Best finish as host team 2,  (hosts 1951 and 1995, gold in both tournaments).
 Most appearances without conquest the gold 11, .
 Most appearances without be a medalist 5, .
 Most goals scored in a match, one team 14,  vs , 1975.
 Most goals scored in a match, both teams scored 12,  vs , 10–2, 1963.
 Most matches played 75, .
 Most wins 51, .
 Most losses 27 .
 Most draws 22, .
 Most goals scored 170, .
 Most goals conceded 123, .
 Fewest goals conceded 3, .
 Fewest goals scored 2, .
 Most shoot-outs played 5,  (1987, 1995, 2003, 2007, 2019).
 Most shoot-outs won 2,  (1987, 1995);  (1995, 2019).
 Most shoot-outs lost 4,  (1987, 1995, 2007, 2019).

Individual records

Most goals scored in a match 7, Aírton vs , 1963.
Most goals scored in a tournament 11, Aírton, 1963.
Most goals scored in a tournament without being the topscorer 9, Víctor Rangel, 1975.
Most goals scored in a gold medal match 3, Vicente Pereda, 1967.
Most medals conquered 2, Juan Carlos Oleniak: 1959, 1963. 
2, Roberto Telch: 1963, 1971.
2, Jorge Massó: 1971, 1979.
2, José Francisco Reinoso: 1971, 1979.
2, Andrés Roldán: 1971, 1979.
2, José de Jesús Corona: 2003, 2011.
Players who have scored in more than one tournament 10, Ed Murphy: 8 (1959), 2 (1963).
6, Juan Carlos Oleniak: 2 (1959), 4 (1963).
4, Gastón Monterola: 1 (1951), 3 (1959).
3, Francisco Fariñas: 1 (1967), 2 (1971).
3, Jorge Massó: 2 (1971), 1 (1975).
2, Regino Delgado: 1 (1975), 1 (1979).
2, Carlos Solano: 1 (1975), 1 (1979).
2, Jorge Maya: 1 (1979), 1 (1987).
Most clean sheets 4, Gustavo Eberto, 2003.

Hat-tricks

Penalty shoot-outs
Key
 = scored penalty
 = scored penalty which ended the shoot-out
 = missed penalty
 = missed penalty which ended the shoot-out
 = first penalty in the shoot-out

References

Football at the Pan American Games
International association football competition records and statistics